Shabayevo (Şabay) is a rural locality (a village) in Burayevsky Selsoviet, Burayevsky District, Bashkortostan, Russia. The population was 273 as of 2010. There are 3 streets.

Geography 
Shabayevo is located 7 km southwest of Burayevo (the district's administrative centre) by road. Shunyakovo is the nearest rural locality.

References 

Rural localities in Burayevsky District